The Simien vlei rat (Otomys simiensis) is a species of rodent in the family Muridae. It is found in northern Ethiopia.

Conservation 

The species is known from less than 10 locations in Ethiopia. However, it is thought to occur in a protected area, which justified the reasoning behind the "Least Concern" assessment by the IUCN.

References

Mammals described in 2011
Mammals of Ethiopia